The 1891 State of the Union Address was written by Benjamin Harrison, the 23rd president of the United States. It was to both houses of the 52nd United States Congress on Wednesday, December 9, 1891, by a clerk. He said, "The vista that now opens to us is wider and more glorious than ever before. Gratification and amazement struggle for supremacy as we contemplate the population, wealth, and moral strength of our country."

References

State of the Union addresses
Presidency of Benjamin Harrison
52nd United States Congress
State of the Union Address
State of the Union Address
State of the Union Address
State of the Union Address
December 1891 events
State of the Union